Nalchity is an upazila of Jhalokati District in the division of Barisal, Bangladesh.

History 
Some family members of Isa Khan moved from Sarail to Nalchity. Abdul Ghani Khan, a 14th-generation descendant of Isa Khan, is the current head of this branch of the family. The region later became a free looting field and slave trading zone for Magh and Portuguese pirates. In 1654, Shah Shuja built two forts in one night in the village of Shujabad to better control the region, and to resist and suppress the piracy. One was built with mud, and the other with bricks. The ruins of the forts can be seen from the Barisal-Jhalokati highway.

In 1924, the British authorities established a thana (police administrative headquarters) in Nalchity. On 7 March 1927, the British Raj police killed twenty Bengali Muslims in a mosque compound in the village of Kulkati. The event is now known as the Ponabalia Massacre. During the Bangladesh Liberation War of 1971, the Pakistan Army shot down 13 Bengalis on 13 May. In midnight on 30 June, Bengali freedom fighters raided the Nalchity Police Station and freedom fighter Yunus was killed in the affray. Nalchity was liberated on 8 December. Nalchity Thana was upgraded to an upazila (sub-district) in 1983 as part of the President of Bangladesh Hussain Muhammad Ershad's decentralisation programme.

Geography 
It has 38,006 households and a total area of 237.17 km2.

Demographics
According to the 1991 Bangladesh census, Nalchity had a population of 203,563. Males constituted 50.02% of the population, and females 49.98%. The population aged 18 or over was 100,836.  Nalchity had an average literacy rate of 47.1% (7+ years), compared to the national average of 32.4%.

Administration
Nalchity Upazila is divided into Nalchity Municipality and ten union parishads: Bhairabpasha, Dapdapia, Kulkati, Kusanghal, Mollahat, Magar, Nachan Mohal, Ranapasha, Siddhakati, and Subidpur. The union parishads are subdivided into 118 mauzas and 138 villages.

Nalchity Municipality is subdivided into 9 wards and 21 mahallas.

The current mayor of Nalchity is Taslim Chowdhury while the MP of the region is Amir Hossain Amu (2018). Yunus Lasker is the Upazila Chairman representing Awami League, which was previously represented by MD Salauddin Khan Selim (President of Shaitpakia School and former CIP). Salauddin did not contest in the last election, forcing the party to change its nominee.

Notable people
Amir Hossain Amu, former Minister of Industries and Grand Alliance coordinator

See also
 Upazilas of Bangladesh
 Districts of Bangladesh
 Divisions of Bangladesh

References 

Upazilas of Jhalokati District